The 2021 Vancouver Whitecaps FC season was the club's eleventh season in Major League Soccer, the top division of soccer in the United States and Canada. Including previous iterations of the franchise, this was the 44th season of professional soccer being played in Vancouver.

Due to COVID-19 cross-border restrictions imposed by the Canadian government, Vancouver Whitecaps FC along with two other Canadian MLS teams began playing home matches in the United States at the start of the season while also sharing stadiums with other American MLS teams. The team temporarily played home matches at Real Salt Lake's Rio Tinto Stadium at Sandy, Utah at the start of the season. On July 23, MLS announced that the Whitecaps will play home matches in Vancouver in August.

On August 27, the Whitecaps parted ways with head coach Marc Dos Santos and assistant coach Phillip Dos Santos. Vanni Sartini was named as acting head coach.

Current roster

Transfers

In

Transferred in

Loans In

Out

Transferred out

Loans out

Major League Soccer

Preseason

Regular season

League tables

Western Conference

Overall

Results

Matches

Playoffs

Canadian Championship

Statistics

Appearances and goals

|-
! colspan="14" style=background:#dcdcdc; text-align:center| Goalkeepers 
 
 
 
|-
! colspan="14" style=background:#dcdcdc; text-align:center| Defenders 
 
 

    
  
                             
                                          
|-
! colspan="14" style=background:#dcdcdc; text-align:center| Midfielders 

 
 
 
 
    
     
              
                          
                       
|-
! colspan="14" style=background:#dcdcdc; text-align:center| Forwards 

 

|-
! colspan="14" style=background:#dcdcdc; text-align:center| Players transferred out during the season

Goalscorers

Clean sheets

Disciplinary record

Notes

References

Vancouver Whitecaps
Vancouver Whitecaps
Vancouver Whitecaps
Vancouver Whitecaps FC seasons